U Got Miilk ? is the second studio album by American rapper Miilkbone, released on April 17, 2001 by XCaliber Entertainment and Lightyear Entertainment. The album generated three noncharting singles in "Yes Yes Y'all", "Dear Slim", and "A Few Good Men". "Dear Slim" attacked rapper Eminem, who had dissed Miilkbone on his 1998 track "Just Don't Give a Fuck".

Miilkbone dropped out of the public eye after the album's release, until resuming his career in 2013.

Track listing

References 

2001 albums
Hip hop albums by American artists